Organisation is the second studio album by English electronic band Orchestral Manoeuvres in the Dark (OMD), released on 24 October 1980 by Dindisc. On Organisation the group worked with a producer for the first time, enlisting former Gong bass player Mike Howlett, while session musician Malcolm Holmes became the band's full-time drummer. The record is noted for its dark, melancholic tone in comparison to other OMD releases.

Organisation received generally favourable reviews and provided OMD with their first top-10 album in the United Kingdom, where it peaked at number six on the UK Albums Chart. "Enola Gay" was the only single taken from the record, and was the group's fourth entry on the UK Singles Chart, reaching number eight. Organisation was remastered and re-released in 2003, with several bonus tracks.

Background

OMD wrote the bulk of Organisation in June and July 1980. Dindisc requested a new studio album before Christmas; lead vocalist Andy McCluskey recalled, "We were too naive to disagree." Backing tracks were recorded at the band's Gramophone Suite in Liverpool. They later moved on to Ridge Farm in Rusper to record vocals and additional instrumentation, working with Mike Howlett (former bass player of Gong). This marked the first time the group had worked with a producer; keyboardist Paul Humphreys said, "We learned a lot from [Howlett]. We were young and didn't understand the recording process and he guided us and pushed us – he was sensitive to our more esoteric, experimental side." Additional recording was completed at Advision, London, and The Manor, Shipton-on-Cherwell.

Organisation features a darker, more melancholic tone than OMD's other work. The band had been Factory label-mates, and had played many gigs with Manchester group Joy Division, whose frontman Ian Curtis died by suicide during the writing of the album. OMD's compositions were influenced by Joy Division's moody sound, with "Statues" being partially inspired by Curtis himself; the record also drew from krautrock influences. McCluskey handled the majority of the songwriting, as Humphreys devoted more time to his relationship with California-based Maureen Udin. Malcolm Holmes, who had drummed for precursor outfit the Id and provided session musicianship for OMD (notably on "Julia's Song", from the group's debut studio album), was recruited as a full-time band member, replacing the TEAC tape recorder named "Winston".

Sole single "Enola Gay" had little in common with the downbeat feel of the rest of the record, despite its bleak subject matter. The song was written at the same time as the band's debut studio album, as was "Motion and Heart", which was considered as a second single. "The Misunderstanding" is a holdover from the Id. "The More I See You" is a cover of a song written by Mack Gordon and Harry Warren in 1945, and popularised by Chris Montez in 1966. The track began as an original composition, but McCluskey found himself singing the words to "The More I See You" over the song, which morphed into a cover version. OMD's arrangement is radically different from that of previous versions.

"Promise" features Humphreys' first lead vocal, and represents his first solo composition on an OMD album. "Stanlow" was written about the Stanlow Refinery in Ellesmere Port, Cheshire, where McCluskey's father and sister worked. OMD cherished the view of the refinery lit up at night, often observing it when returning from tours. McCluskey's father granted the band access to the site to sample sounds from the machinery; a diesel pump forms the rhythmic opening of "Stanlow". "VCL XI" was the name of McCluskey and Humphreys' short-lived, pre-OMD group, which itself was named after a valve on the back of Kraftwerk's 1975 album Radio-Activity album (the name of the valve is written "VCL 11" on the Radio-Activity sleeve). The record's title is a homage to the band Organisation, a precursor to Kraftwerk.

As with all of OMD's early album covers, the artwork was designed by Peter Saville Associates. It features a photograph by Richard Nutt of the cloud-covered peak of Marsco in the Red Cuillin hills, on the Isle of Skye.

Critical reception

Organisation met with largely positive reviews. Dave McCullough of Sounds awarded the album a full five stars, asserting, "[OMD] are a youth-mirror more valuable than any Street-Chic punk outfit I can imagine... warmer than your so-called 'warm' bands, your [Bruce] Springsteens and your [Graham] Parkers could ever be. They reflect the young horror of where and how we live but, in their songs at least, they face the problems with an irrepressible intuitive sense that makes the best pop of any time." Record Mirrors Daniela Soave said of the record, "Full of drama and numerous layers, it conjures up many images, so much so that it could almost be a film soundtrack... outstanding." Flexipop noted that Organisation sees "the best of all the electric bands come up with another winner".

In The Age, John Teerds wrote, "Much of the music is hook-laden and highly-memorable. Orchestral Manoeuvres... have a very distinctive sound which is hard to beat when you're looking for the best in a modern, electronic style." Lynden Barber of Melody Maker observed, "OMD have produced not so much a collection of songs as a pervading mood, a feeling of restlessness spiked by an unsettling edge that never allows the music to descend into complacency... a very healthy step forward." Smash Hits journalist Mark Ellen was indifferent to the record, encouraging OMD to "cease clinging to the idea of being a serious 'experimental' band and go all-out for the shameless synth-pop single."

In a retrospective article, Ryan Leas of Stereogum dubbed Organisation "one of the great albums from the early synth-pop era", on which OMD were "forging new sonic territory but also capturing the feeling of the times". Trouser Press wrote, "[Organisation] pays attention to ensure variation in the tunes... With nods to John Foxx and David Bowie, OMD overlays melodies to dramatic effect; the performances are excellent." Critic Dave Thompson praised the record's "smart lyrics, sharp songs... and genuinely innovative use of electronics", while AllMusic's Ned Raggett said it is "packed with a number of gems, showing [OMD]'s reach and ability continuing to increase".

Legacy
Despite featuring one of OMD's most well-known hits in "Enola Gay", Organisation has been recognised as a "lost" classic, overshadowed by the band's subsequent albums and other music of the period. The record, and its cover art, have nevertheless been ranked among the best of 1980. In an article for Fact, Minimal Wave Records founder Veronica Vasicka identified Organisation as one of the mainstream releases to have influenced the development of the minimal wave genre. Porcupine Tree frontman Steven Wilson named the album as an influence and one of his "top 5 not-so-guilty pleasures of all time", saying, "It's not [OMD's] biggest record, but I think it's probably their best. It's got that Teutonic, Germanic kind of cold wave thing going on, which I've always been a sucker for."

Elsewhere, Organisation has garnered praise from DJ/producer Paul van Dyk and composer Yann Tiersen, both of whom cite it as the first album they ever acquired. Van Dyk stated, "It was extremely influential. Early electronic, but also melodies and poppy elements, the general imprint of what later came for me in music." Graphic designer and musician Brett Wickens, who co-founded the bands Spoons and Ceramic Hello, was affected by Organisations marriage of artwork and music. He identified the record sleeve as the standout from OMD's catalogue, and said of the musical component, "It was extremely moving. I used to listen to it driving in the dark a lot." Physicist and musician Brian Cox wrote in 2018, "I eventually persuaded my parents to buy Organisation, an album of gentle darkness beneath clouded skies, which I fell in love with aged 12 and still love today."

In an interview with BBC Radio 6 Music in April 2020, Britain's Poet Laureate, Simon Armitage, was asked to select a song from history for airplay: he chose Organisations closing track, the near seven-minute "Stanlow".

Track listing

Original release

US release (OMD)
Organisation was not formally released in the US; instead Epic Records released a compilation in 1981. This US release collects material from Organisation and the first OMD studio album, but retains the sleeve-art of the debut LP.

2003 remaster

Notes
"Annex" was the B-side to "Enola Gay". "Introducing Radios", "Distance Fades Between Us", "Progress", and "Once When I Was Six" are 1978 performances at The Factory that were originally available on a 7" released with the first 10,000 copies of Organisation, and initial copies of the cassette (which had a special silver cover/inserts).

Personnel
Orchestral Manoeuvres in the Dark
 Paul Humphreys – synthesizers, electronic organ, electronic and acoustic piano, rhythm programming, acoustic and electronic percussion and vocals
 Andy McCluskey – synthesizer, bass guitar, electronic organ, treated acoustic piano, rhythm programming, acoustic and electronic percussion and vocals
 Malcolm Holmes – drums and percussion

Charts

Weekly charts

Year-end charts

Certifications

References

External links
 Album lyrics
 

1980 albums
Albums produced by Mike Howlett
Orchestral Manoeuvres in the Dark albums